The de Havilland Sea Venom is a British postwar carrier-capable jet aircraft developed from the de Havilland Venom. It served with the Royal Navy Fleet Air Arm and with the  Royal Australian Navy. The French Navy operated the Aquilon, developed from the Sea Venom FAW.20, built under licence by SNCASE (Sud-Est).

Design and development
The Sea Venom was the navalised version of the Venom NF.2 two-seat night fighter, and was used as an all-weather interceptor by the Fleet Air Arm (FAA). The necessary modifications for use on the Royal Navy's aircraft carriers included folding wings, a tailhook (which retracted into a characteristic "lip" over the jetpipe) and strengthened, long-stroke undercarriage. The canopy was modified to allow ejection from underwater. The first prototype made its first flight in 1951, and began carrier trials that same year. A further two prototypes were built. The first production Sea Venom took the designation FAW.20 (Fighter, All-Weather). It was powered by a single de Havilland Ghost 103 turbojet engine and its armament was the same as the RAF version. The next variant was the FAW.21, which included the modifications introduced in the Venom NF.2A and NF.3. Some of these modifications included the Ghost 104 engine, a clear-view canopy and American radar. The final Royal Navy variant was the FAW.22 powered by the Ghost 105 engine. A total of 39 of this type were built in 1957–58. Some were later fitted out with the de Havilland Firestreak air-to-air missile.

Seven FAW.21s were modified in 1958 for Electronic countermeasures (ECM) purposes, with the cannon replaced by the ECM equipment. These became the ECM.21. 831 Naval Air Squadron, the sole squadron to be equipped with it, was shore-based at RAF Watton from 1963 and disbanded in 1966. Converted FAW.22s were similarly known as the ECM.22.

A modernised Sea Venom project, the DH.116 with swept wings and upgraded radar was considered, but cancelled as the Royal Navy believed that any replacement needed two engines. The de Havilland Sea Vixen ultimately replaced the Sea Venom.

Operational history

Royal Navy service
In 1956 Sea Venoms, alongside RAF Venoms, took part in the Suez War which began on 31 October. They were from Nos. 809, 891, 892, 893, 894, 895 Naval Air Squadrons based on the light fleet carrier  and fleet carrier . The Anglo-French invasion, codenamed Operation Musketeer, took place in response to the nationalisation of the Suez Canal by Egypt's leader, General Nasser. The air war began on 31 October 1956 signalling the beginning of the Suez War. The Sea Venoms launched many sorties, bombing a variety of targets in Egypt in the process.

Sea Venoms also saw service during conflicts in the Middle East.

By 1959, the Sea Venom began to be replaced in Royal Navy service by the de Havilland Sea Vixen, an aircraft that also had the distinctive twin-boom tail. The Sea Venom would be withdrawn from frontline service soon afterwards. The type continued to fly with second line FAA units until the last were withdrawn in 1970.

Service with other nations

Thirty-nine Sea Venom FAW.53s saw service with the Royal Australian Navy (RAN), replacing the Hawker Sea Fury. The Sea Venom entered service in 1956 and, during its service with the RAN, operated off the aircraft carrier HMAS Melbourne. It was taken out of first-line service in 1967, replaced by the American McDonnell Douglas A-4G Skyhawk.

From 1957 to 1961, French Navy Aquilons took part in counter-insurgency operations in Algeria. They were withdrawn from service in 1965.

Variants

Sea Venom
Sea Venom NF.20
Prototype Sea Venom, based on Venom NF.2., three-built.
FAW.20
Initial production aircraft, based on Venom NF.2A. 4,850 lbf (21.6 kN) Ghost 103 turbojet engine, AI Mk 10 (US SCR 720) radar. 50 built.
FAW.21
Improved version, equivalent to Venom NF.3. 4,950 lbf (22.1 kN) Ghost 104 engine, AI Mk 21 (US APS-57) radar, strengthened long-stroke undercarriage. 167 built.
ECM.21
Six FAW.21s modified from 1957 for ECM purposes. No armament. 
FAW.22
More powerful (5,300 lbf (23.6 kN)) Ghost 105 engine, giving improved high-altitude performance. 39 new built.
ECM.22
Equivalent of ECM.21, based on FAW.22
FAW.53 
Australian designation for the Sea Venom FAW.21. 39 built.

SNCASE Aquilon

SNCASE (Sud-Est) license-built 101 Sea Venom FAW.20 as the Aquilon for the French Navy.
Aquilon 20 – 4 examples assembled from the parts provided by de Havilland plus 25 locally built.
 Aquilon 201 – Three prototypes built in France.
 Aquilon 202 – Two-seat version with ejection seats, an American AN/APQ-65 radar and air-conditioning. 25 built.
 Aquilon 203 – Single-seat version with an American AN/APQ-94 radar and equipped with racks for air-to-air missiles. Prototype converted from Aquilon 202 plus 40 built.
 Aquilon 204 – Two-seat training version without guns. 6 Converted from Aquilon 20.

Operators

Sea Venom operators

 Royal Australian Navy Fleet Air Arm
723 Squadron
724 Squadron
805 Squadron
808 Squadron

 Royal Navy - Fleet Air Arm
700 Naval Air Squadron F.A.W.20, F.A.W.21
736 Naval Air Squadron F.A.W.21
738 Naval Air Squadron F.A.W.21
750 Naval Air Squadron F.A.W.21
751 Naval Air Squadron F.A.W.21
766 Naval Air Squadron F.A.W.20, F.A.W.21
787 Naval Air Squadron F.A.W.21
808 Naval Air Squadron F.A.W.20
809 Naval Air Squadron F.A.W.20, F.A.W.21
831 Naval Air Squadron F.A.W.22
890 Naval Air Squadron F.A.W.20, F.A.W.21
891 Naval Air Squadron F.A.W.20, F.A.W.21, F.A.W.22
892 Naval Air Squadron F.A.W.21
893 Naval Air Squadron F.A.W.21, F.A.W.22
894 Naval Air Squadron F.A.W.21, F.A.W.22
Airwork Fleet Requirements Unit

Aquilon operators

 French Navy Aviation Navale
 11F Naval Squadron
 16F Naval squadron

Surviving aircraft

Australia
 WZ898/WZ910 – FAW.53 on static display at the Queensland Air Museum in Caloundra, Queensland.
 WZ901 – FAW.53 on static display at the Australian National Aviation Museum at Melbourne, Victoria.
 WZ910 – FAW.53 on static display at the Queensland Air Museum in Caloundra, Queensland.
 WZ931 – FAW.53 on static display at the South Australian Aviation Museum in Port Adelaide, South Australia.
 WZ937 – FAW.53 on static display at the Fleet Air Arm Museum in Nowra, New South Wales.

France
 53 – Aquilon 203 on display at the Museum of Naval Aeronautics in Rochefort, Charente-Maritime.

Malta
 XG691 – FAW.22 is being restored at the Malta Aviation Museum in Ta' Qali, Attard.

Poland
 XG613 – FAW.21 on static display at the Polish Aviation Museum in Kraków, Lesser Poland.

United Kingdom
 WW138 – FAW.21 on static display at the Fleet Air Arm Museum in Yeovilton, Somerset.
 WW145 – FAW.22 on static display at the National Museum of Flight in East Fortune, East Lothian.
 WW217 – FAW.22 on static display at the Newark Air Museum in Newark-on-Trent, Nottinghamshire.
 XG680 – FAW.22 on static display at the North East Aircraft Museum in Sunderland, Tyne and Wear.
 XG730 – FAW.22 is being restored at the de Havilland Aircraft Museum in London Colney, Hertfordshire.
 XG737 – FAW.22 is being restored at the East Midlands Aeropark in Castle Donington, Leicestershire.

Specifications (Sea Venom FAW.22)

See also

References

Notes

Bibliography

 Green, William. The World's Fighting Planes. London: Macdonald, 1964.
 Gunston, Bill. Fighters of the Fifties. Cambridge, UK: Patrick Stephens Limited, 1981. .
 Mason, Francis K. The British Fighter since 1912. Annapolis, Maryland: Naval Institute Press, 1992. .
 
 Jackson, A. J. de Havilland Aircraft since 1909. London: Putnam, Third edition, 1987. .
 Sturtivant, Ray. "De Havilland's Sea Venom...a Naval Twin Boomer". Air International,  Vol 39. No 2, August 1990, pp. 81–90. ISSN 0306-5634.
 Thetford, Owen. British Naval Aircraft 1912–58. London: Putnam Publishing, 1958.

 Wilson, Stewart. Sea Fury, Firefly and Sea Venom in Australian Service. Weston Creek, ACT, Australia: Aerospace Publications, 1993. .
 Winchester, Jim, ed. "De Havilland Sea Vixen." Military Aircraft of the Cold War (The Aviation Factfile). Rochester, Kent, UK: The Grange plc., 2006. .

1950s British fighter aircraft
Carrier-based aircraft
Sea Venom
Single-engined jet aircraft
Mid-wing aircraft
Twin-boom aircraft
Aircraft first flown in 1951